Dehradun district is a district in Garhwal which is a part of Uttarakhand state in northern India. The district headquarters is Dehradun, which has also served as the interim capital of Uttarakhand since its founding in 2000. The district has 6 tehsils, 6 community development blocks, 17 towns and 764 inhabited villages, and 18 unpopulated villages. As of 2011, it is the second most populous district of Uttarakhand (out of 13), after Haridwar. Dehradun district also includes the prominent towns of Rishikesh, Mussoorie, Landour and Chakrata. The district stretches from the Ganges river in the east to the Yamuna river in the west, and from the Terai and Shivaliks in the south and southeast to the Great Himalaya in the northwest. During the days of British Raj, the official name of the district was Dehra Dun. In 1842, Dun was attached to Saharanpur district and placed under an officer subordinate to the Collector of the district but since 1871 it is being administered as separate district.

Dehradun is located 230 km from the national capital, Delhi. The National Oil and Natural Gas Corporation, Survey of India, and many educational institutions like Doon University, Uttrakhand Technical Institute, Indian Institute of Petroleum, Uttaranchal University, Forest Research Institute, Wildlife Institute of India, Rashtriya Indian Military College and Indian Military Academy are also situated here. Basmati rice, tea and litchi orchards are some of the major agricultural crops.

The region was seized as a war spoil from the Maharaja of Tehri-Garhwal as a consequence of the Gurkha War of 1814–16, and attached administratively to Saharanpur District to its immediate south, which was already in British hands.

History
Dehradun includes various Puranic stories and cultures. It is mentioned in the Ramayana that Lord Rama, along with brother Lakshmana, came to the area after defeating Ravana, the Rakshasa king of Lanka. The area is also linked to Dronacharya, the guru of the Kauravas and Pandavas in the Mahabharata. The area of Rishikesh is mentioned in the Skanda Purana as having been given to rishis (sages) by Lord Vishnu after killing the asuras Madhu-Kaitabha and their companions who tormented the rishis. Ancient temples, statues and archaeological remains have been found at the sites in and around the area that are mentioned in the Ramayana and the Mahabharata. These remains have been dated to be approximately 2000 years old.

The location of the area, the ancient traditions and customs still followed here, folk songs coming down from generations, and their contemporaneous literature point to the fact that the area witnessed various events during the periods of the Ramayana and the Mahabharata. The Pandavas held influence over the region after the battle of the Mahabharata and the area was ruled by the descendants of Subahu as administrators under the Kuru Kingdom at Hastinapura. The discovery of Ashokan edicts at Kalsi near Dehradun show that the area was quite prosperous. Huen Tsang also observed Kalsi as Sudhanagara in the 7th century AD. Archaeological remains from the time of Raja Rasal have been found at Haripur near Kalsi.

The area was attacked by Mahmud Ghaznavi, Timur in 1368. Guru Ram Rai, the errant eldest son of the seventh Guru of the Sikhs, Guru Har Rai, established his 'Dera' (camp) in the Dun Doon Valley around 1676 and the town that grew around this 'Dera' has come to be known as 'Dehradun'. He founded his own Udasi Panth (sect) and received support from Aurangzeb. Rohilla chieftain Najib ad-Dawlah in 1757 and Ghulam Kadir in 1785. This kept the area in disarray till 1801. The British captured the area in 1816 and founded the cities of Landour and Mussourie in 1827–28. The district was added to the Garhwal division in the 1970s. It was established as the capital of Uttarakhand after the establishment of the state as Uttaranchal in the year 2000.

Demographics

As of the 2011 Census of India, Dehradun district has highest population (1,698,560) in Uttarakhand. The Decadal growth rate has jumped up from 25% (1991–2001) to 32.48% (2001–2011). This is the third highest in Uttarakhand after Haridwar (33.16%) and Udham Singh Nagar (33.40%). The district has a gender ratio of 902 as against a state average of 963. This has however improved from 887 in the 2001 census. The population density is 550, again the 3rd highest after Haridwar(817) and Udham Singh Nagar (648). The state average is 189. The literacy rate is the highest in the state at 85.24% (90.32 for males, 79.61 for females)

According to the 2011 census Dehradun district has a population of 1,698,560, roughly equal to the nation of Guinea-Bissau or the US state of Idaho. This gives it a ranking of 290th in India (out of a total of 640). Its population growth rate over the decade 2001-2011 was 32.48%. Dehradun has a sex ratio of 902 females for every 1000 males, and a literacy rate of 85.24%. Scheduled Castes and Scheduled Tribes make up 13.48% and 6.57% of the population respectively.

At the 2011 census, 60% of the district's population identified their first language as Hindi, 17% reported being speakers of Garhwali, 7.4% opted for Jaunsari, 3.8% chose Urdu, 3.4% – Punjabi, 3.3% – Nepali, 1.1% – Kumaoni, 0.87% – Bhojpuri, 0.58% – Tibetan, and 0.55% – Bengali.

Assembly constituencies
 Chakrata
 Vikasnagar
 Sahaspur
 Dharampur
 Raipur
 Rajpur Road
 Dehradun Cantonment
 Mussoorie
 Doiwala
 Rishikesh

Climate

Cities and Towns

Cities
1. Dehradun

2. Rishikesh

3. Vikasnagar

4. Mussoorie

Towns
1. Doiwala 

2. Selakui

3. Chakrata

4. Herbertpur

5. Dakpathar

6. Sahaspur

7. Harrawala

Culture
Dehradun district is a part of Garhwal region, therefore local culture has been dominant in the district over the past decade. Apart from Garhwali, other languages spoken in the region are Jaunsari, Hindi and English. Blue buses (privately owned and operated) in addition to 3 wheelers are the main mode of transport in the city. Dehradun finds itself split across two central electoral constituencies- Tehri Garhwal (including Mussoorie) and Pauri Garhwal (including Haridwar, Rishikesh).

See also
Ghamandpur
Haldwani
Pantnagar

References

External links
 
 Dehra Dun District, Imperial Gazetteer of India, v. 11, p. 210, 1909

 
Districts of Uttarakhand